General elections were held in Liechtenstein on 10 January 1926, with a second round on 24 January. The result was a victory for the ruling Christian-Social People's Party, which won 9 of the 15 seats in the Landtag.

Results

By electoral district

First round

Second round

References

Liechtenstein
General
1926 01
Liechtenstein
1926